Manhay is a municipality of Wallonia located in the province of Luxembourg, Belgium. 

On 1 January 2007 the municipality, which covers 119.81 km², had 3,185 inhabitants, giving a population density of 26.6 inhabitants per km².

The municipality consists of the following districts: Dochamps, Grandménil, Harre, Malempré, Odeigne and Vaux-Chavanne (town centre).

See also
 List of protected heritage sites in Manhay

References

External links
 

 
Municipalities of Luxembourg (Belgium)